James Francis O'Rourke (November 28, 1893 – May 14, 1986) was a Canadian professional baseball infielder. He played in Major League Baseball for the Boston Braves, Brooklyn Robins,
Washington Senators, Boston Red Sox, Detroit Tigers, and St. Louis Browns between 1912 and 1931.

Biography
O'Rourke was born in Hamilton, Ontario, Canada, and debuted as the third youngest player in the National League at 17 years age. In his career, he played at all four infield positions, primarily third base, where he had a .949 career fielding percentage in 598 games. O'Rourke was also a longtime New York Yankees scout.

In 1986, O'Rourke died at age 92 in Chatham, New Jersey. He was inducted posthumously into the Canadian Baseball Hall of Fame in 1996.

References

External links

1893 births
1986 deaths
Baseball players from Hamilton, Ontario
Binghamton Bingoes players
Birmingham Barons players
Boston Braves players
Boston Red Sox players
Bridgeport Orators players
Brooklyn Robins players
Buffalo Bisons (minor league) players
Canadian expatriate baseball players in the United States
Charlotte Hornets (baseball) players
Cincinnati Reds scouts
Detroit Tigers players
El Dorado Lions players
Canadian baseball players
Canadian sportspeople of Irish descent
Major League Baseball infielders
Major League Baseball players from Canada
Major League Baseball second basemen
Major League Baseball shortstops
Major League Baseball third basemen
Milwaukee Brewers (minor league) managers
Milwaukee Brewers (minor league) players
Montreal Royals players
New London Planters players
New York Yankees scouts
St. Louis Browns players
Toronto Maple Leafs (International League) players
Utica Utes players
Washington Senators (1901–1960) players
Wilkes-Barre Barons (baseball) players
Canadian Baseball Hall of Fame inductees